"Lunatic Fringe" is a song by the Canadian rock band Red Rider from their 1981 album, As Far as Siam. 

The song reached  on the rock radio airplay chart in Billboard in September 1981, and was awarded a SOCAN Classic award in 2009 by the Society of Composers, Authors and Music Publishers of Canada for reaching the 100,000-airplay mark on (Canadian) domestic radio.

Background
Guitarist Tom Cochrane wrote the song after becoming concerned about a resurgence of anti-Semitism in the 1970s, and was also inspired after reading a book about Raoul Wallenberg, who rescued Jews from The Holocaust during World War II. Some sources have incorrectly cited the murder of John Lennon as the song's primary inspiration; Cochrane had already written the song before Lennon was killed, but recorded the song's first demo the evening of the murder. He has stated that his feelings about the event, and how it echoed the theme of his song, galvanized him to release the song as a single despite advice from the record label that the song was not commercial enough.

Charts

Legacy

The song's widespread influence inspired Cincinnati's rock radio station WEBN to pay homage to it with the station's early slogan "WEBN, The Lunatic Fringe" introduced in 1984. Then in 1988, this slogan was updated to "The Lunatic Fringe Of American FM", which is still in use as of November 2018. The song was used in the opening scene of Miami Vice Episode 1.15, "Smuggler's Blues" which aired on February 1, 1985; the 1985 movie Vision Quest about a high school wrestler starring Matthew Modine; in the Season 3, Episode 1 closing credits for the HBO series Eastbound & Down; and in the Season 2, episode 6 closing credits for the Netflix series Mindhunter.

In 2009, the song was ranked No. 82 on VH1's 100 greatest one-hit wonders of the 1980s.

References

1981 singles
Red Rider songs
Songs written by Tom Cochrane
Song recordings produced by Richard Landis
Works about antisemitism
1981 songs
Capitol Records singles